Islwyn was one of five local government districts of Gwent from 1974 to 1996.

Islwyn may also refer to:
Islwyn (Senedd constituency)
Islwyn (UK Parliament constituency)

People with the given name
Islwyn Davies, Welsh rugby player
Islwyn Davies (priest) (1909–1981)
Islwyn Ffowc Elis (1924–2004), Welsh-language writer
Islwyn Evans (1898–1974), Welsh rugby player
Islwyn Jones (born 1935), Welsh footballer
Islwyn Morris (1920–2011), Welsh-language actor

See also
William Thomas (Islwyn) (1832-1878, bardic name Islwyn), Welsh-language poet and clergyman

Welsh masculine given names